Rolla was a sailing ship built in 1800 at South Shields, England. She made one voyage transporting convicts to New South Wales. She then made a voyage for the British East India Company from China back to Britain. She leaves Lloyd's Register in 1858.

Career
Lloyd's Register  (LR) for 1801 gives the name of Rollas master as R. Brown, her owner as Brown & Co., and her trade as London-Surinam. During the year J. New replaced R. Brown. During 1802, R. Cumming replaced J. New as master. In the 1802 issue of Lloyd's Register there is no longer any listing for armament.

New South Wales, China, and back (1802-04)
Under the command of Robert Cumming, Rolla sailed from Cork, Ireland on 4 November 1802.  The Victualling Commissioners had also put on board supplies for the Colony: 22,203 pounds of sugar, 74,412 pounds of pork, and 230,496 pounds of flour; the Bill of Lading was dated 30 January 1802, i.e., in arrears.

Rolla arrived at Rio de Janeiro on 12 January 1803. She sailed from Rio on 6 February and arrived at Port Jackson on 12 May. She had left with 127 male and 37 female convicts. Eight male convicts died on the voyage.

Rolla left Port Jackson on 20 September bound for China.

Francis returned to Sydney with some of the men. Cumberland, with Matthew Flinders, went to the Torres Straits and on to Île de France. Lieutenants Fowler, Flinders (Matthew Flinders' brother), and John Franklin sailed with Rolla to China.

Next, Rolla sighted several of islands in the Ratak and Ralik Chains of the Marshall Islands. Cummings sent in a cutter, but the heavy surf prevented it from landing. The next day six canoes of friendly natives came off. Next, Rolla sighted Jaluit Atoll.

Rolla arrived at Whampoa anchorage on 14 December. Homeward bound, she crossed the Second Bar on 31 January 1804. She was supposed to be part of the homeward bound fleet of East Indiamen under Nathaniel Dance, but inexplicably missed the fleet's departure. As a result, she missed the battle of Pulo Aura.

After leaving Canton, Rolla visited Malacca on 14 March, before reaching St Helena on 13 July, and arriving at the Downs on 9 October.

Rolla had travelled from St Helena in convoy with the East Indiamen City of London, Calcutta, and Wyndham, and two vessels from the South Seas, Lively and Vulture. On the way the convoy ran into severe weather with the result that Prince of Wales, which had also left St Helena with the rest, foundered with the loss of all on board; this had been her maiden voyage.

Fate
Rolla was no longer listed in Lloyd's Register after 1858.

Notes

Citations

References
 
 
 
 
 

1800 ships
Ships built by Temple shipbuilders
Convict ships to New South Wales
Ships of the British East India Company
Age of Sail merchant ships
Merchant ships of the United Kingdom